Fondren is both a given name and surname. Notable people with the name include:

Fondren Mitchell (1921–1952), American football player
Debra Jo Fondren (born 1955), American model
Ella Florence Fondren (18801982), American philanthropist
Fred Fondren (1948–1992), American actor
Larry Fondren, American entrepreneur
Walter Fondren (1936–2010), American football player
Walter Fondren Sr. (1877–1939), American oil industry businessman